The Polish Academy Award for Best Film Score is an annual award given to the best Polish film score of the year.

Winners and nominees

References

External links
 Polish Film Awards; Official website 

Polish film awards
Awards established in 1999
Polish music awards
1999 establishments in Poland